Najasa is a municipality and town in the Camagüey Province of Cuba.

Demographics
In 2012, the municipality of Najasa had a population of 16,470.

See also
Najasa Municipal Museum
List of cities in Cuba
Municipalities of Cuba

References

External links

Populated places in Camagüey Province